Conexibacter stalactiti is a Gram-positive, strictly aerobic, non-spore-forming, rod-shaped and motile bacterium from the genus of Conexibacter which has been isolated from stalactites from a lava cave in Jeju in Korea.

References

 

Actinomycetota
Bacteria described in 2017